John Copping was Dean of Clogher from 1738 until his death in 1743.

Copping was born in Luton and educated at Gonville and Caius College, Cambridge. There is a memorial to him in St Ann, Dublin.

Notes

.

Deans of Clogher
18th-century Irish Anglican priests
Alumni of Gonville and Caius College, Cambridge
1743 deaths